The Peshawar High Court is the highest judicial institution of Khyber-Pakhtunkhwa. It is located in the provincial capital Peshawar. The Parliament passed a bill extending the jurisdiction of the Supreme Court (SC) and the Peshawar High Court (PHC) to Federally Administered Tribal Areas (FATA), one of a handful of reforms paving the way for a merger of the tribal areas with Khyber Pakhtunkhwa.

History
During the last days of the 19th century, the viceroy of India Lord Curzon (1899–1905), proposed the creation of Khyber-Pakhtunkhwa  province (then NWFP) which was approved by the Secretary of State for India, Lord George F. Hamilton, on 20 December 1900.

The province was formally founded on 9 November 1901, (the King's birthday) had to get one Judicial Commissioner. The Khyber-Pakhtunkhwa Law and Justice Regulation No. VII of 1901 was enacted by the Governor-General-in-Council, under section 3 of the Government of India Act, 1854, in order to establish judicial institutions.

Current formation
The Constitution of Pakistan, 1973 provides that Peshawar High Court shall have a Bench each at Abbottabad and DI Khan. Article 199 of the Constitution lays down in detail the jurisdiction of the High Court. The jurisdiction was more or less the same as provided under the Constitution of 1956 and further detailed under the Constitution of 1962.

The Constitution of Pakistan, 1956, Article 170, states that:

"Notwithstanding anything contained in Article 22, each High Court shall have power throughout the territories in relation to which it exercise jurisdiction, to issue to any person or authority, including in appropriate cases any Government directions, orders or writs, including writs in the nature of habeas corpus, mandamus, prohibition, quo warranto and certiorari, for the enforcement of any of the rights conferred by Part II and for any other purpose."

Justices of Peshawar High Court 
High Court is headed by a Chief Justice. The bench consist of Justices and additional judges. The retirement age of Chief Justice and Justices is 62 years. The Additional Judges are initially appointed for one year. After that their services could either be extended or they could be confirmed or they are retired. The current Chief Justice of Peshawar High Court is Justice Qaiser Rashid Khan.

Current composition 
The Peshawar High Court is currently made up of the following Justices (in order of seniority).

Provisional Constitutional Order 25 March 1981
Muhammad Daud Khan - Refused PCO
Karimullah Duranni - Refused PCO

Provisional Constitutional Order 26 January 2000
Javed NawazGandapur - Did not take oath under PCO
Muhammad Nawaz Khan - Did not take oath under PCO
Mian Muhammad Ajmal - Take oath under PCO was Chief Justice
Sardar Muhammad Raza - Take oath under PCO
Khalida Rasheed - Take oath under PCO
Mian Shakirullah Jan]] - Take oath under PCO
Nasir ul Mulk - Take oath under PCO
Abdul Rauf Laghmani - Take oath under PCO
Shahzad Akbar - Take oath under PCO
Talaat Qayum Qureshi - Take oath under PCO
Malik Hamid Saeed - Take oath under PCO
Shah Jehan Yousafzai - Take oath under PCO

Provisional Constitutional Order 3 November 2007
Tariq Parvez Khan - Dismissed on the ground of corruption
Ijaz Afzal - Did not take oath under PCO
Dost Muhammad Khan (Justice) - Dismissed on the ground of corruption (Elevated to the Supreme court (Feb:01.2014)
Shah Jehan Khan Yousafzai - Dismissed on the ground of corruption
Talaat Qayyum Qureshi - Take oath under PCO and become chief justice
Ijazul Hassan Khan - Elevated to the Supreme court
Muhammad Qaim Jan Khan - Elevated to the Supreme court
M. Salim Khan - Take oath under PCO
Muhammad Raza - Take oath under PCO
Jehan Zaib Rahim - Take oath under PCO
Raj Muhammad Khan Khattak - Take oath under PCO
Said Maroof Khan - Take oath under PCO
Hamid Farooq Durrani - Take oath under PCO
Syed Sajjad Hassan Shah - Take oath under PCO
Judges appointed after PCO
Shaji-ur-Rehman Khan Khattak
Ghulam Mohiuddin Malik
Syed Yahya Gilani
Ziauddin Khattak
Syed Musadiq Hussain Gilani

List of former chief justices of Peshawar High Court
Bashir-ud-Din Ahmad Khan - 1-7-1970 to 24-5-1972
S. Ghulam Safdar Shah - 25-5-1972 to 31-10-1976
Abdul Hakeem Khan - 1-11-1976 to 3-10-1979
Shah Nawaz Khan (Chief Justice) - 3-10-1979 to 5-4-1981 
Mian Burhan-ud-Din - 5-4-1981 to 17-12-1981 
Syed Usman Ali Shah - 19-12-1981 to 7-12-1987 
Sardar Fakhre Alam - 7-12-1987 to 7-2-1991
Fazal Ilahi Khan - 9-2-1991 to 1-4-1993
Abdul Karim Khan Kundi	- 1-4-1993 to 24-1-1995 
Syed Ibne Ali - 25-1-1995 to 28-2-1997 
Abdur Rehman Khan - 1-3-1997 to 3-11-1997
Mahbub Ali Khan - 4-11-1997 to 11-5-1999
Qazi Muhammad Farooq - 12-5-1999 to 5-1-2000 
Mian Muhammad Ajmal - 6-1-2000 to 27-4-2000
Sardar Muhammad Raza Khan - 28-4-2000 to 9-1-2002
Mian Shakirullah Jan - 10-1-2002 to 30-7-2004
Nasir-ul-Mulk - 31-7-2004 to 5-4-2005
Tariq Pervez Khan - 5-4-2005 to 03-11-2007
Talat Qayyum Qureshi - 3-11-2007 to 18-01-2008
Muhammad Raza Khan - 21-01-2008 to 07-08-2008
Jehan Zaib Rahim - 8-8-2008 to 5-09-2008
Tariq Parvez Khan - 5-9-2008 to 20-10-2009
Ejaz Afzal Khan - 20-10-2009 to 16-11-2011
Dost Muhammad Khan - 17-11-2011 to 31-01-2014
Mian Fasih-ul-Mulk - 31-01-2014 to 07-04-2014
Mazhar Alam Khan Miankhel - 8-04-2014 to 29-12-2016
Yahya Afridi - 30-12-2016 to 27-06-2018
Waqar Ahmed Seth(late) - 28 June 2018 to 12 November 2020.

List of former justices of Peshawar High Court
Bashir-ud-Din Ahmad Khan
Ghulam Safdar Shah
Sher Bahadur Khan
Shah Zaman Babar
Qaisar Khan
Muhammad Daud Khan
Kareemullah Durrani
Abdul Hakim Khan
Shah Nawaz Khan
Mian Burhanuddin
S. Usman Ali Shah
Sardar Fakhre Alam
Ali Hussain Qazilbash
Fazal Ilahi Khan
Abdur Rehman Khan Kaif
Fazal Ellahi Khan
Abdul Karim Khan Kundi
Nazir Ahmad Bhatti
Muhammad Bashir Jehangiri (Not retired from PHC)
Qazi Hamiduddin
Sardar Muhammad Raza
Salim Dil Khan (Died during service)
Mian Shakirullah Jan (Not retired from PHC)
Khalida Rashid (Not retired from PHC)
Nasirul Mulk
Jawaid Nawaz Khan Gandapur
Tariq Parvez Khan (Not retired from PHC)
Shah Jehan Khan
Qazi Ehsanullah Qureshi
Malik Hamid Saeed
Talaat Qayyum Qureshi (Died during service)
Shahzad Akbar Khan
Ijazul Hassan Khan
Muhammad Qaim Jan Khan
Ejaz Afzal Khan (Not retired from PHC)
Raj Muhammad Khan
Said Maroof Khan
Hamid Farooq Durrani
Khalid Mahmood (Reversed)
Fasihul Mulk
Attaullah Khan
Miftah-Ud-Din Khan
Irshad Qaiser
Muhammad Daud Khan
Nisar Hussain Khan
Muhammad Younas Thaheem
Qalandar Ali Khan
Muhammad Ghazanfar Khan
Muhammad Ayub Khan
Syed Afsar Shah
Ikramullah Khan
Nasir Mehfooz

See also
 Supreme Court of Pakistan
 Islamabad High Court
 Balochistan High Court
 Sindh High Court
 Lahore High Court
 Court system of Pakistan

References

External links 
 PHC official website'

 
High Courts of Pakistan